Roni Sevänen (born 17 April 1995) is a Finnish professional ice hockey defenceman who currently plays for Porin Ässät in the Finnish Liiga.

Playing career
On 11 June 2021, Sevänen as a free agent signed an initial one-year contract with Porin Ässät. He previously spent his first five seasons in the Liiga with Lukko.

References

External links

1995 births
Living people
Ässät players
Finnish ice hockey defencemen
People from Eura
Lukko players
Sportspeople from Satakunta